Skortsinos is a village in the municipal unit Falaisia, Arcadia, Greek. It is situated on a hillside south of the mountain Tsemperou, close to the border with Laconia. It is 5 km southeast of Voutsaras, 7 km north of Longanikos and 15 km southeast of Megalopoli. In 2011 its population was 139. The karstic spring of the river Evrotas is 1.7 km south of Skortsinos.

Population

See also
List of settlements in Arcadia

References

External links
History and Information about Skortsinos

Falaisia
Populated places in Arcadia, Peloponnese